Thousands of Tiny Luminous Spheres is a compilation album released in 2000 by New Zealand band The Bats.

Track listing

The track "North by North" featured in the ABC Television series The Hollowmen as the theme from the opening and closing titles.

The Bats (New Zealand band) albums
2000 compilation albums
Flying Nun Records compilation albums